Arts One Presents, formerly Arts Center of the Ozarks, is best known for its theater production along with visual art.  The organization began as the Springdale Fine Arts Association in 1967, originally being the only community theatre in Northwest Arkansas. After opening, the ACO has shown a wide variety of shows, including: local community shows, traveling shows and the American Girl Fashion Show.

References 
Website http://www.acozarks.org/

Theatre companies in Arkansas
Springdale, Arkansas